Cranbourne is a village in Berkshire, England, within the civil parish of Winkfield in the borough of Bracknell Forest. Neither Cranbourne Chase nor Cranbourne Lodge, which it surrounds, are in Winkfield but across the border in Windsor.

History
Cranbourne was the location of a free school that eventually became Ranelagh Church of England School. St Peter's Church was built in 1850. The Fleur de Lis pub on the corner of Hatchet Lane is now flats.

External links

Villages in Berkshire
Winkfield